Juvik is a surname. Notable people with the surname include:

Kjell-Idar Juvik (born 1966), Norwegian politician
Sverre Johan Juvik (1922–2015), Norwegian politician